The Royal College of Chemistry (RCC) was a college originally based on Oxford Street in central London, England. It operated between 1845 and 1872.

The original building was designed by the English architect James Lockyer in 1846 with the foundation stone being laid by Albert, Prince Consort on June 16, 1846.

The College was set up to teach practical chemistry. Many politicians donated funds to establish the college, including Benjamin Disraeli, William Gladstone and Robert Peel. It was also supported by Prince Albert.

The first director was August Wilhelm von Hofmann. Frederick Augustus Abel studied under von Hofmann. Sir William Crookes, Edward Divers and J. A. R. Newlands also attended the college.

The young William Henry Perkin studied and worked at the college under von Hofmann, but resigned his position after discovering the first synthetic dye, mauveine, in 1856. Perkin's discovery was prompted by his work with von Hofmann on the substance aniline, derived from coal tar, and it was this breakthrough which sparked the synthetic dye industry, a boom which some historians have labelled 'the second chemical revolution'.

The college was merged into the Royal School of Mines in 1853. It was the first constituent college of Imperial College London and  eventually became the Imperial College Chemistry Department.

References

External links

 Site of the Royal College of Chemistry — 22 May 2003, Oxford Street, London
 Chemistry at Imperial College: the first 150 years
 Royal College of Chemistry (Great Britain)

Educational institutions established in 1845
Educational institutions disestablished in 1872
1845 establishments in England
1872 disestablishments in England
Former buildings and structures in the City of Westminster
History of the City of Westminster
History of Imperial College London
Education in the City of Westminster
Chemistry education
History of chemistry
Defunct universities and colleges in London
19th century in London